The 1978 FIFA World Cup was the 11th edition of the FIFA World Cup, a quadrennial international football world championship tournament among the men's senior national teams. It was held in Argentina between 1 and 25 June.

The Cup was won by the host nation, Argentina, who defeated the Netherlands 3–1 in the final, after extra time. The final was held at River Plate's home stadium, Estadio Monumental, in the Argentine capital of Buenos Aires. This win was the first World Cup title for Argentina, who became the fifth team (after Uruguay, Italy, England, and West Germany) to be both hosts and world champions and the third South American team to win a World Cup. Argentina, the Netherlands, and Brazil were the gold, silver, and bronze medalists, respectively. Iran and Tunisia made their first appearances in the tournament. This was also the last World Cup tournament to use the original inclusion of 16 teams. Since the first World Cup in 1930, only 15 teams (plus the host, who automatically qualified) had been allowed to qualify (the reigning title holders also received automatic qualification from 1934 through 2002); but for the next World Cup, in Spain, FIFA expanded that tournament to 24 teams.

This tournament was marred by flagrant controversy, domestic politics, and alleged interference and match-fixing by the Argentine authoritarian military junta government, who were using this tournament as an opportunity for nationalistic propaganda, and for the relatively new military junta to seek legitimacy on the world stage. One player, Ralf Edström, was arrested for speaking to a person in Buenos Aires; however, the Argentine military released him upon recognising its error (that he was a player, not an ordinary person).

The official match ball was the Adidas Tango.

Host selection

Argentina was chosen as the host nation by FIFA on 6 July 1966 in London, England. Mexico withdrew from the bidding process after having been awarded the 1970 competition two years earlier.

The logo is based on President Juan Perón's signature gesture: a salute to the crowd with both arms extended above his head. This was one of the most famous, populist images of Perón. The design was created in 1974, two years prior to the military coup in 1976. The military leadership were aware that the World Cup's logo symbolized Perón's gesture, and they tried to change the competition's logo. At this point, the design was already broadly commercialized and the merchandise had already been made: a forced modification "would trigger a sea of lawsuits against the country", so the military had no option but to give up their attempts and leave it.

The monetary cost of preparing to host the World Cup was put at $700 million, including building three new stadia and redeveloping three others; building five press centres; a new communications system costing $100 million; and improvements to transport systems.

Qualification

England, Belgium, Czechoslovakia (the European champions) and the Soviet Union failed to qualify for the second World Cup in succession, losing out to Italy, the Netherlands, Scotland and Hungary respectively. 1974 quarter-finalists East Germany and Yugoslavia were eliminated by Austria and Spain and thus also failed to qualify for the finals, along with Bulgaria which failed to qualify for the first time since 1958 after losing to France. Bolivia's win meant Uruguay also failed to qualify for the first time since 1958. Newcomers to the finals were Iran and Tunisia; Austria qualified for the first time since 1958, while France, Spain and Hungary were back for the first time since 1966. Peru and Mexico returned after missing the previous tournament. For the first time, more than 100 nations entered the competition.

List of teams qualifying
The following 16 teams qualified for the final tournament:

AFC (1)
 
CAF (1)
 
OFC (0)
 None qualified

CONCACAF (1)
 
CONMEBOL (3)
  (hosts)
 
 

UEFA (10)

Controversy
A controversy surrounding the 1978 World Cup was that Argentina had undergone a military coup of its democratic government only two years before the cup, which installed a dictatorship known as the National Reorganization Process. Less than a year before the World Cup, in September 1977, Interior Minister General Albano Harguindeguy, stated that 5,618 people had recently disappeared. The infamous Higher School of Mechanics of the Navy (known by its acronym ESMA) held concentration camp prisoners of the Dirty War and those held captive reportedly could hear the roars of the crowd during matches held at River Plate's Monumental Stadium, located only a mile away; prompting echoes of Hitler's and Mussolini's alleged political manipulation of sports during the 1936 Berlin Olympics and 1934 FIFA World Cup. Because of the political turmoil, some countries, most notably the Netherlands, considered publicly whether they should participate in the event. Despite this, all teams eventually took part without restrictions. However, most notably, Dutch star Johan Cruyff, who won the Golden Ball in the previous 1974 FIFA World Cup, refused to take part in the 1978 World Cup, even though he earlier participated in the 1978 FIFA World Cup qualification. Allegations that Cruyff refused to participate because of political convictions were denied by him 30 years later—he and his family had been the victims of a kidnapping attempt a few months before the tournament. Several criminals entered his house in Barcelona at night and tied him and his family up at gunpoint. More controversy surrounded the host, Argentina, as all of their games in the first round kicked off at night, giving the Argentines the advantage of knowing where they stood in the group. This issue would arise again in Spain 1982, which prompted FIFA to change the rules so that the final two group games in subsequent World Cups (as well as in every other international tournament, starting with the UEFA Euro 1984) would be played simultaneously.

Argentina's controversial and favorable decisions in their matches have caused many to view their eventual win as illegitimate; many cite the political climate and worldwide pressure on the Argentine government as the reason for these decisions. Desperate to prove their stability and prominence to the world after their coup two years earlier, the government used whatever means necessary to ensure that the team would progress far in the tournament.

Suspicions of match fixing arose even before the tournament began; Lajos Baróti, the head coach of Argentina's first opponents, Hungary, said that "everything, even the air, is in favor of Argentina". He also talked about the financial imperative to have Argentina win the World Cup: "The success of Argentina is financially so important to the tournament".

From Will Hersey's article "Remembering Argentina 1978: The Dirtiest World Cup of All Time":The other teams in Argentina and Hungary's group were the much-fancied France and Italy, establishing the tournament's toughest qualifying section. After the victory against Hungary, one junta official remarked to Leopoldo Luque that "this could turn out to be the group of death as far as you are concerned." It was delivered with a smile.

"Uppermost in my mind was that earlier that day, the brother of a close friend of mine had disappeared", recalled Luque. "His body was later found by villagers on the banks of the River Plate with concrete attached to his legs. At that time, opponents of the regime were sometimes thrown out of aeroplanes into the sea."In their second group stage game against France, Argentina were the beneficiaries of multiple favourable calls. After France were denied what looked to be a clear penalty in the first half, an anonymous French player said he had heard the referee tell Daniel Passarella (the player who committed the foul), "Don't do that again please, or I might have to actually give it next time."

Argentina v Peru

Further accusations have surrounded the game Argentina and Peru played in the second round of the tournament. Following Brazil's 3–1 win over Poland, Argentina needed to win by a margin of four goals to proceed to the final and did so by defeating Peru by 6–0. There were allegations that the authoritarian Argentine military government interfered to ensure Argentina would defeat Peru through intimidation, though these were denied by Peruvian captain Héctor Chumpitaz and several Peruvian players. Some accusations originated in the Brazilian media and pointed to the fact that the Peruvian goalkeeper, Ramón Quiroga, had been born in Argentina. There was also an alleged deal, reported by the British media as an anonymous rumour, that involved the delivery of a large grain shipment to Peru by Argentina and the unfreezing of a Peruvian bank account that was held by the Argentine Central Bank. Another alleged deal, published by a Colombian drug lord in a controversial book, involved the Peruvian team being bribed without any political implications. A third alleged deal, stated by a Peruvian leftist politician, encompassed sending 13 Peruvian dissidents exiled in Argentina back to Peru. 

Three months before the World Cup, Argentina had beaten Peru 3–1 in Lima, their head-to-head record was 15–3 in favour of the host nation, and Peru had never beaten Argentina away from home. However, Peru had conceded only six goals in their previous five games in the World Cup. During the first half, Peru hit the post twice after two counters when the game was 0–0. Argentina managed to get 2–0 ahead before the end of the first 45 minutes. During the second half, Argentina was 4–0 ahead when Peru had another clear chance. Argentina kept attacking and scored twice more, making it 6–0 and surpassing the required margin.

There was also some domestic controversy as well, as Argentine manager César Luis Menotti did not call up the then-17-year-old Argentinos Juniors local star Diego Maradona, for Menotti felt Maradona was too young to handle the pressures of such an important tournament on home soil and that the expectations of the team's performance would probably revolve around the Buenos Aires-born youngster. In addition, Maradona's usual position of number 10 (play-making attacking midfielder) was taken by Mario Kempes, who ended up as the Best Player and Top Goal Scorer.

Format
The format of the competition stayed the same as in 1974: 16 teams qualified, divided into four groups of four. Each group played a round-robin with two points for a win and one for a draw, and goal difference used to separate teams level on points. The top two teams in each group would advance to the second round, where they would be split into two groups of four. The winners of each group would play each other in the final, and the second-place finishers in the third place match.

Summary

First round
The first round produced several surprises. Poland won Group 2 ahead of world champions West Germany, after holding the Germans to a goalless draw and then beating Tunisia and Mexico. The Germans then beat Mexico 6–0, and finally played out a second goalless draw against Tunisia. Although they failed to qualify for the second round, Tunisia made history by beating Mexico 3–1 while trailing 0–1 at half time. It was the first time that any African team had won a match at the World Cup finals.

Peru pushed the Netherlands into second place in Group 4, where Scotland missed out on goal difference for the second successive tournament. Teófilo Cubillas was outstanding for Peru, scoring twice against Scotland in Peru's 3–1 win and hitting a hat-trick in their 4–1 victory over newcomers Iran. Rob Rensenbrink of the Netherlands also scored three times against Iran, scoring all the goals as the Dutch won 3–0. Scotland drew with Iran 1–1 and the only highlight of their campaign was a 3–2 victory over the Netherlands in their final group game which was not enough to prevent elimination. Iran, the reigning Asian champions, went out of the tournament winless. Rensenbrink's goal against Scotland was the 1000th goal of World Cup history. Scotland's Willie Johnston was expelled from the World Cup after he was found to have taken a banned stimulant during the opening game against Peru.

The biggest surprise of all came in Group 3, where Austria finished ahead of Brazil. The Austrians beat Spain and Sweden, while Brazil were held to draws by the same two teams. The draw between Brazil and Sweden was especially controversial; Welsh referee Clive Thomas awarded Brazil a very late corner kick, and Zico directly headed the kick into the net; but Thomas blew for time before Zico made contact with the ball, and the goal was disallowed. The Brazilian players were not happy with the decision, but the final result remained a 1–1 draw. Heading into their final group game, Brazil needed to beat Austria to be certain of advancing to the second round and managed a 1–0 win thanks to a goal from Roberto Dinamite. Brazil and Austria thus finished with the same number of points and the same goal difference, but Austria won the group by virtue of having scored more goals.

Group 1 had the strongest line-up of teams in the first round, featuring Italy, the host Argentina, France and Hungary. The two places in the second round were claimed before the final round of games, with Italy and Argentina both beating France and Hungary. The match between Italy and Argentina decided who topped the group, and a goal from Roberto Bettega midway through the second half was enough to give that honour to Italy. It also forced Argentina to move out of Buenos Aires and play in Rosario.

The 1978 World Cup marked the fourth and last occasion during which a national team did not wear its own kit to play a match (the first being in the 1934 World Cup third place match between Germany and Austria; the second in the 1950 World Cup first round match between Switzerland and Mexico and the third in the 1958 World Cup first round match between West Germany and Argentina). The incident happened during the game between France and Hungary. Both teams arrived at the venue with only their white change kits, resulting in a delayed kickoff while officials went in search of the jerseys of a local team from Mar del Plata, Club Atlético Kimberley; the jerseys had vertical green and white stripes and were worn by France.

Second round
In the all-European Group A, the Netherlands got off to a flying start by thrashing Austria 5–1, Johnny Rep scoring two of their goals. In a rematch of the 1974 final, the Dutch then drew 2–2 with West Germany, who had previously shared a goalless game with Italy. The Italians beat Austria 1–0, and so the Netherlands faced Italy in their last group game knowing that the winners would reach the final. Ernie Brandts scored an 18th-minute own goal to put Italy ahead at half-time, but he made up for his mistake by scoring at the right end in the fifth minute of the second half. Arie Haan got the winner for the Dutch with 15 minutes remaining, and the Netherlands had reached their second successive World Cup Final. In the game known as the miracle of Cordoba, West Germany were surprisingly beaten by Austria 2–3 which marked their end as World Champions.

Group B was essentially a battle between Argentina and Brazil, and it was resolved in controversial circumstances. In the first round of group games, Brazil beat Peru 3–0 while Argentina saw Poland off by a score of 2–0. Brazil and Argentina then played out a tense and violent goalless draw, so both teams went into the last round of matches with three points. Argentina delayed the kick-off of its last match to await the result of the Brazil-Poland encounter. Brazil won by a 3–1 score, meaning Argentina had to beat Peru by four clear goals to reach the final but they managed to do it. Trailing 2–0 at half-time, Peru simply collapsed in the second half, and Argentina eventually won 6–0. As previously noted, rumors suggested that Peru might have been bribed or threatened into allowing Argentina to win the match by such a large margin. However, nothing could be proved, and Argentina met the Netherlands in the final. Brazil took third place from an enterprising Italian side with Nelinho scoring a memorable goal, and were dubbed "moral champions" by coach Cláudio Coutinho, because they did not win the tournament, but did not lose a single match.

Final

The final, Argentina vs Netherlands, was also controversial, as the Dutch accused the Argentines of using stalling tactics to delay the match. The host team came out late and questioned the legality of a plaster cast on René van de Kerkhof's wrist, which the Dutch said allowed tension to build in front of a hostile Buenos Aires crowd.

Mario Kempes opened the scoring for the hosts before Dick Nanninga equalised a few minutes from the end. Rob Rensenbrink had a glorious stoppage-time opportunity to win it for the Netherlands but his effort came back off the goal post. Argentina won the final 3–1 after extra time, after Daniel Bertoni scored and Kempes, who finished as the tournament's top scorer with six goals, added his second of the day. The Netherlands, because of the controversial game events, refused to attend the post-match ceremonies after the match ended. They had lost their second consecutive World Cup final, both times to the host nation, after losing to West Germany in 1974. Argentina won 5 games but became the first team to win the World Cup after failing to win two matches, where they had lost to Italy in the first round and drawn with Brazil in the second round. Four years later, Italy would win the next World Cup despite failing to win three games.

Mascot
The official mascot of this World Cup was Gauchito, a boy wearing an Argentina kit. His hat (with the words ARGENTINA '78), neckerchief, and whip are typical of gauchos.

Venues

In 1972, eight venues were preselected; six that were used for the finals, plus La Plata and Tucuman. La Plata, the city of the diagonals, promised a "one-of-a-kind stadium" but by 1974 it was scrapped by internal bids. The Estadio Ciudad de La Plata was finally completed in 2003. In the case of Tucuman, an ambitious stadium of 70,000 spectators had been promised in Horco Molle, similar to the current Racing Club de Avellaneda stadium, along with the roof. The Tucuman venue was temporarily suspended in 1974 and was decommissioned the following year, given the intensity of the actions of the guerrillas and the Armed Forces in the province. Three new stadiums were built (Estadio Chateau Carreras in Córdoba; Estadio José María Minella in Mar del Plata; and Estadio Ciudad de Mendoza in Mendoza) and the other three were remodelled.

Of the six venues used, the Estadio Monumental in Buenos Aires was the largest and most used venue, hosting nine total matches, including the final. The Carreras Stadium in Cordoba hosted eight matches, the stadiums in Mendoza, Rosario and Mar del Plata each hosted six matches and José Amalfitani Stadium in Buenos Aires hosted three matches — bringing the Argentine capital and largest city's total to 12 — nearly a third of all the matches played. The Minella stadium in Mar del Plata was heavily criticized due to its terrible pitch, which was deemed "nearly unplayable"; whereas the Amalfitani stadium in Buenos Aires, which was refurbished with the completion of press boxes and another section of upper stands but was the least used stadium for the tournament, was praised for its very good pitch. Brazil was forced by tournament organizers to play all three of its first group matches in Mar del Plata; there had been rumors and allegations of the organizers deliberately sabotaging the Minella stadium's pitch to weaken Brazil's chances of success.

Match officials

AFC

 Farouk Bouzo
 Jafar Namdar
 Abraham Klein

CAF
 Youssou N'Diaye
CONCACAF
 Alfonso González Archundia
CONMEBOL

 Ramón Barreto
 Arnaldo Cézar Coelho
 Ángel Norberto Coerezza
 César Orosco
 Juan Silvagno

UEFA

 Ferdinand Biwersi
 Charles Corver
 Jean Dubach
 Ulf Eriksson
 António Garrido
 John Gordon
 Sergio Gonella
 Alojzy Jarguz
 Erich Linemayr
 Dušan Maksimović
 Ángel Franco Martínez
 Károly Palotai
 Pat Partridge
 Adolf Prokop
 Nicolae Rainea
 Francis Rion
 Clive Thomas
 Robert Wurtz

Squads
For a list of all squads that appeared in the final tournament, see 1978 FIFA World Cup squads.

Seeding

First round

Group 1

Group 2

Group 3

Group 4

Second round

Group A

Group B

Knockout stage

Third place play-off

Final

Goalscorers
With six goals, Mario Kempes was the top scorer in the tournament. In total, 102 goals were scored by 62 players, with three of them credited as own goals.
6 goals
 Mario Kempes
5 goals

 Rob Rensenbrink
 Teófilo Cubillas

4 goals

 Leopoldo Luque
 Hans Krankl

3 goals

 Dirceu
 Roberto Dinamite
 Paolo Rossi
 Johnny Rep
 Karl-Heinz Rummenigge

2 goals

 Daniel Bertoni
 Nelinho
 Roberto Bettega
 Ernie Brandts
 Arie Haan
 Zbigniew Boniek
 Grzegorz Lato
 Archie Gemmill
 Heinz Flohe
 Dieter Müller

1 goal

 René Houseman
 Daniel Passarella
 Alberto Tarantini
 Erich Obermayer
 Walter Schachner
 Reinaldo
 Zico
 Marc Berdoll
 Bernard Lacombe
 Christian Lopez
 Michel Platini
 Dominique Rocheteau
 Károly Csapó
 András Tóth
 Sándor Zombori
 Iraj Danaeifard
 Hassan Rowshan
 Romeo Benetti
 Franco Causio
 Renato Zaccarelli
 Víctor Rangel
 Arturo Vázquez Ayala
 Dick Nanninga
 René van de Kerkhof
 Willy van de Kerkhof
 César Cueto
 José Velásquez
 Kazimierz Deyna
 Andrzej Szarmach
 Kenny Dalglish
 Joe Jordan
 Juan Manuel Asensi
 Dani
 Thomas Sjöberg
 Mokhtar Dhouieb
 Néjib Ghommidh
 Ali Kaabi
 Rüdiger Abramczik
 Bernd Hölzenbein
 Hansi Müller

Own goals
 Andranik Eskandarian (against Scotland)
 Ernie Brandts (against Italy)
 Berti Vogts (against Austria)

FIFA retrospective ranking
In 1986, FIFA published a report that ranked all teams in each World Cup up to and including 1986, based on progress in the competition, overall results and quality of the opposition. The rankings for the 1978 tournament were as follows:

Notes

External links

1978 FIFA World Cup Argentina, FIFA.com
Details at RSSSF
FIFA Technical Report (Part 1), (Part 2), (Part 3), (Part 4), (Part 5), (Part 6) and (Part 7)

 
FIFA World Cup tournaments
International association football competitions hosted by Argentina
World Cup
June 1978 sports events in South America